Watonga is a city in Blaine County, Oklahoma. It is 70 miles northwest of Oklahoma City. The population was 5,111 at the 2010 census. It is the county seat of Blaine County.

History
Watonga is located on former Cheyenne and Arapaho Indian Reservation lands that were allotted to individual tribal members and the excess opened to white settlers in the Land Run of 1892. Watonga is named after Arapaho Chief Watonga, whose name means "Black Coyote".

The town began as a tent city on April 19, 1892. A post office opened in Watonga during the same year.  However, the first railroad line through Watonga was not built until 1901–02, when the Enid and Anadarko Railway (later the Chicago, Rock Island and Pacific Railway) constructed a  rail line from Guthrie.

Geography
Watonga is located in central Blaine County at  (35.849249, -98.411591).

Demographics

, there were 4,658 people, 1,273 households, and 858 families residing in the city. The population density was 1,703.1 people per square mile (656.4/km). There were 1,507 housing units at an average density of 551.0 per square mile (212.4/km). The racial makeup of the city was 61.19% White, 15.33% African American, 8.24% Native American, 1.55% Asian, 2.02% Pacific Islander, 4.89% from other races, and 6.78% from two or more races. Hispanic or Latino of any race were 11.91% of the population.

There were 1,273 households, out of which 33.9% had children under the age of 18 living with them, 51.3% were married couples living together, 11.5% had a female householder with no husband present, and 32.6% were non-families. 30.3% of all households were made up of individuals, and 17.0% had someone living alone who was 65 years of age or older. The average household size was 2.53 and the average family size was 3.16.

In the city, the population was spread out, with 20.5% under the age of 18, 12.5% from 18 to 24, 36.7% from 25 to 44, 17.9% from 45 to 64, and 12.4% who were 65 years of age or older. The median age was 34 years. For every 100 females, there were 169.4 males. For every 100 females age 18 and over, there were 191.1 males.

The median income for a household in the city was $27,208, and the median income for a family was $31,391. Males had a median income of $23,056 versus $16,146 for females. The per capita income for the city was $10,567. About 12.4% of families and 17.5% of the population were below the poverty line, including 24.1% of those under age 18 and 16.8% of those age 65 or over.

According to one report, Watonga's 42.9% reduction in population from 2010 to 2017 makes it the fastest shrinking place in Oklahoma.

Economy
Watonga's economy has largely been based on agriculture since statehood. In the early days, local farmers primarily were producers of wheat.
The dairy industry grew in western Oklahoma and led to the opening of the Watonga Cheese Factory in 1941. It was one of the state's five active dairy product plants in 2004. The plant subsequently closed in 2007.

Love's Travel Stops & Country Stores began with a single leased gas station in Watonga in the mid-1960s. Love's is now in 41 states, is approaching 500 travel centers, and employs 25,000 nationwide.

The city hosted the Diamondback Correctional Facility, owned by the Corrections Corporation of America from 1998, and the prison grew to become the town's largest employer. But the prison, housing Arizona inmates, experienced a riot in May 2004, and the contract to utilize the facility was not renewed, resulting in the prison closing in May 2010. This left 300 prison workers jobless or transferred elsewhere. The prison was still vacant as of March 2017.

The town Walmart closed in 2016.

Government
Watonga has an aldermanic form of government.

Arts and culture
The city hosts an annual Watonga Cheese Festival in October. The festival was formed in 1976 by the Watonga Chamber of Commerce because the town had the only cheese factory in Oklahoma at the time. The festival has continued even after the closing of the factory in 2007. In 2013, a wine competition was added to the festival.

The town newspaper, the Watonga Republican, has been in publication since 1892.

Watonga has the T.B. Ferguson Home Museum, which consists not only of the 1901 Victorian-style house of publisher T.B. Ferguson, but also various artifacts of the era.

Notable people

 Sis Cunningham, musician known for folk and protest music
 Thompson Benton Ferguson, newspaper publisher and eighth governor of the Oklahoma Territory
 Trevon Hartfield, NFL safety
 Robert J. Helberg, aeronautical engineer for NASA who contributed to the Lunar Orbiter program
 Byron Houston, retired NBA player
 Guy Lookabaugh, coach and former player of multiple sports
 Jim Lookabaugh, football player and coach
 Clarence Nash (1904–1985), the voice of Donald Duck in the 1930s
 Patrick Sherrill, perpetrator of the Edmond post office shooting

Parks and recreation
Roman Nose State Park, which opened in 1937 and was one of the state's seven original state parks, is seven miles north of Watonga, off State Highway 8 and 8a. It includes two lakes, the smaller being Lake Boecher, and the larger the 55-surface-acre Lake Watonga. The park includes hiking trails, guided horseback rides and hayrides to a historic natural-rock swimming pool, miniature golf, and an 18-hole par-70 golf course. For lodging, the park has Roman Nose Lodge, built in 1956 and renovated in 2010, along with more than 90 campsites, almost equally split between RV and tent sites.

Historic sites
Ferguson Chapel was a Presbyterian Church, dedicated in 1903 and continued in use until 1972. In 1992, the building was restored by town volunteers, and is used as an event center.

Seven of 17 NHRP-listed sites in Blaine County are located in Watonga, including the Blaine County Courthouse, the Noble Hotel, and the United States Post Office Watonga.

Transportation
Watonga connects with U.S. Route 270, State Highway 3, State Highway 8, and State Highway 51a.

Watonga is served by Watonga Regional Airport.

Rail freight carriage pertaining to grain, fertilizer, and other agriculture-related products is provided by AT&L Railroad, which runs from Watonga to Geary to El Reno, Oklahoma, with overhead trackage rights on the Union Pacific from El Reno to Oklahoma City.

Notes

References

External links
 
 Watonga.com
 Ferguson Home Museum

Cities in Blaine County, Oklahoma
Cities in Oklahoma
County seats in Oklahoma